Margaret Ann Carr  (born 1941) is a New Zealand education academic. She is currently emeritus professor at the University of Waikato.

Academic career
After an undergraduate at the University of Waikato and Victoria University of Wellington, Carr completed a 1997 PhD titled Technological practice in early childhood as a dispositional milieu at Waikato.

Carr has research expertise in narrative assessment and early childhood education. Along with Helen May, she was a primary author of Te Whāriki, the first national New Zealand early childhood curriculum.

In the 2002 New Year Honours, Carr was appointed an Officer of the New Zealand Order of Merit, for services to early childhood education. She was appointed emeritus professor at the University of Waikato in April 2018. In 2022 she was elected a Fellow of the Royal Society Te Apārangi.

Selected works

References

1941 births
Living people
New Zealand women academics
University of Waikato alumni
Academic staff of the University of Waikato
New Zealand educational theorists
New Zealand women writers
Officers of the New Zealand Order of Merit
Fellows of the Royal Society of New Zealand
Early childhood education in New Zealand